Meg LeFauve is an American screenwriter and film producer.

Early life 
LeFauve was raised in Warren, Ohio, and attended Syracuse University.

Career 
LeFauve began her film career as a producer and President of Egg Pictures, Jodie Foster's film company. During that time, LeFauve produced films that were nominated for an Emmy, a Golden Globe, and was awarded a Peabody for Jane Anderson's Showtime film, The Baby Dance.  LeFauve produced "The Dangerous Lives of Altar Boys" for Egg Pictures. Starring Kieran Culkin, Jodie Foster and Vincent D'Onofrio, the film opened to rave reviews and won the 2003 IFP Spirit Award for Best First Feature.

LeFauve was a mentor at Meryl Streep's writer's lab, and is currently a consultant to Screen New South Wales, Screen Australia, and Film Victoria.  She has mentored at the Sundance Creative Producer Lab and is a board member and returning participant at CineStory Script Sessions. LeFauve has taught at AFI and served as co-chair of the Graduate Producers Program at UCLA's School of Film and Television, where she taught master level story and development classes for over seven years. LeFauve also has been known to give seminars from time to time.

She was nominated for the Academy Award for Best Original Screenplay for co-writing the script for Pixar's Inside Out. She was nominated for Primetime Emmy Awards in 1999 for producing The Baby Dance. She also produced the 2002 film The Dangerous Lives of Altar Boys. She also wrote the script for The Good Dinosaur which was nominated for a Golden Globe. LeFauve received a "story by" credit on the live action Captain Marvel movie.

Podcast 

Meg LeFauve co-hosts a Podcast, The Screenwriting Life w/ Meg LeFauve and Lorien McKenna. The show, co-hosted by writer Lorien McKenna and producer Jeffrey Crane Graham, is dedicated to unpacking both the craft and artistic journey of pursuing a career in screenwriting. Featured guests include Ed Solomon, Anne Lamott,  Mike Jones, and Bonnie Curtis, among others.

The show was cited as one of Feedspot's Top 25 Screenwriting Podcasts You Must Follow in 2021, FilmCon's Top 10 Recommended Filmmaking Podcasts., and Podcast Magazine's Top 8 Must-Listen Podcasts For Screenwriters.

Personal life 
LeFauve is married to filmmaker Joe Forte.

Filmography

References

External links 
 

Living people
American women screenwriters
Animation screenwriters
Annie Award winners
1969 births
Pixar people